Nikulichev is a rural locality (a khutor) in Terkinskoye Rural Settlement, Serafimovichsky District, Volgograd Oblast, Russia. The population was 18 as of 2010. There are 3 streets.

Geography 
Nikulichev is located on the Archeda River, 58 km northeast of Serafimovich (the district's administrative centre) by road. Poselsky is the nearest rural locality.

References 

Rural localities in Serafimovichsky District